, nicknamed "Nao", is a former professional baseball player from Kyoto, Japan. He is a starting pitcher for the Yokohama DeNA BayStars.

Career
He attended Hōtoku Gakuen High School. He joined the Japanese Olympic baseball team for the 2004 Summer Olympics, and won a bronze medal. He also played with the Japanese national team in the 2006 World Baseball Classic. Tragedy struck in January 2008 when Shimizu's wife died. He has three kids.

After ten seasons with the Chiba Lotte Marines from 2000 to 2009, Shimizu became a free agent and signed with the Yokohama BayStars.  His career numbers with the Marines were 93 wins against 85 losses, with a career 4.02 ERA, tossing 38 complete games and nine shutouts.

References

External links

1975 births
Living people
Baseball in New Zealand
Baseball players at the 2004 Summer Olympics
Chiba Lotte Marines players
Japanese baseball coaches
Japanese expatriates in New Zealand
Medalists at the 2004 Summer Olympics
Nippon Professional Baseball coaches
Olympic baseball players of Japan
Olympic bronze medalists for Japan
Olympic medalists in baseball
Baseball people from Kyoto
Yokohama BayStars players
Yokohama DeNA BayStars players
2006 World Baseball Classic players